William Burlestone or Borleston (died 1406), of Harberton, Devon, was an English politician.

He was a Member (MP) of the Parliament of England for Totnes in January 1377, October 1377, January 1380, 1381, February 1383; and for Plympton Erle in 1381; for Dartmouth in October 1382, February 1383, November 1384, 1385 and February 1388.

References

14th-century births
1406 deaths
English MPs January 1377
English MPs October 1377
English MPs January 1380
English MPs 1381
English MPs October 1382
English MPs February 1383
English MPs November 1384
English MPs 1385
English MPs February 1388
Members of the Parliament of England (pre-1707) for Totnes
Members of the Parliament of England for Plympton Erle
Members of the Parliament of England for Dartmouth